Lenox is an underground metro station in Atlanta, Georgia, serving the Gold Line of the Metropolitan Atlanta Rapid Transit Authority. Located in the Buckhead district, it provides access to Lenox Square and Phipps Plaza, which are located on Peachtree Street across the street from one another, as well as the nearby neighborhoods of Lenox Park and Pine Hills. It also provides connecting bus service to Peachtree Industrial business district, Underground Atlanta, Emory University Hospital Midtown, Woodruff Arts Center, Midtown business district, Piedmont Hospital, and the Atlanta Amtrak station.

This is the northernmost Gold Line station in Fulton County. Northeast of the station, the line crosses into DeKalb County.

Station layout

History
The station was built on the site of Johnsontown, a small community of about 30 African American families originally settled in 1912. The properties were acquired in the early 1980s and the houses razed to make way for the station. The station opened in 1984 when the Northeast Line (now Gold) was extended from Arts Center to Brookhaven (now Brookhaven/Oglethorpe).

Initially, the code was N7. But in 1994, it was changed to NE7.

Parking
Lenox has both a parking lot (193 spaces) and parking deck (128 spaces) for MARTA patrons.

Nearby landmarks and popular destinations
Lenox Square
Phipps Plaza

Bus routes
The station is served by the following MARTA bus routes:
 Route 27 - Cheshire Bridge Road

Connections to other transit systems
Buc Shuttle

References

External links

MARTA station page
nycsubway.org Atlanta page
 Lenox Road entrance from Google Maps Street View

Gold Line (MARTA)
Metropolitan Atlanta Rapid Transit Authority stations
Railway stations in the United States opened in 1984
Railway stations in Atlanta
1984 establishments in Georgia (U.S. state)